N,N-Dimethylethanolamine bitartrate or deanol bitartrate is an organic compound with the chemical formula . It is a white powder. Modern texts refer to the N,N-dimethylethanolamine salt of the natural form of tartaric acid, that is, the salt called N,N-dimethylethanolamine dextrobitartrate, N,N-dimethylethanolamine (2R,3R)-bitartrate or N,N-dimethylethanolamine L-(+)-bitartrate.

Chemistry
N,N-Dimethylethanolamine bitartrate is a N,N-dimethylethanolamine salt of tartaric acid. N,N-Dimethylethanolamine bitartrate contains tertiary ammonium cations (dimethyl(2-hydroxyethyl)ammonium ) and bitartrate anions. Tertiary ammonium cation is a cation in which three hydrogen atoms of ammonium are replaced with organyl groups. In this compound, the three substituents of ammonium are two methyl groups and one 2-hydroxyethyl group. The bitartrate anion is chiral (there are left, right and meso forms of bitartrate, see tartaric acid).

Uses
N,N-Dimethylethanolamine bitartrate is used in biological studies to evaluate motor activity in response to the injection of N,N-dimethylethanolamine.

Safety
N,N-Dimethylethanolamine bitartrate is flammable. Upon catching fire, it might release toxic gases, like carbon monoxide (CO), nitrogen monoxide (NO) and nitrogen dioxide. It may cause skin, eye and respiratory system irritation and a serious eye damage.

References 

Tartrates